The shadow ministry of Peter Dutton is the current shadow cabinet of Australia since 5 June 2022, serving in opposition to the Albanese government. The shadow ministry is the Opposition's alternative to the Albanese ministry, which was sworn in on 1 June 2022.

The shadow ministry was appointed by Peter Dutton following his election as Leader of the Liberal Party and Leader of the Opposition on 30 May 2022. Dutton and newly-elected Nationals leader David Littleproud announced the composition of the shadow ministry on 5 June 2022.

Current arrangement
On 23 December 2022, shadow minister for regional education, regional health and regional development Andrew Gee resigned from the National Party and the shadow ministry. On 4 January 2023, Darren Chester took over Gee's portfolios except regional health, while Anne Webster took over the regional health portfolio as an assistant shadow minister (as opposed to Gee holding the portfolio as a shadow minister).

On 9 February 2023, shadow education minister Alan Tudge announced he would resign from parliament the week after. He resigned from the shadow cabinet on 12 February 2023. Sarah Henderson took over the education portfolio from Tudge, while former frontbencher David Coleman was elevated to the shadow cabinet to take over Henderson's communications portfolio.

Shadow Cabinet

Outer shadow ministry

Shadow assistant ministry

References

Liberal Party of Australia
National Party of Australia
2022 establishments in Australia
2022 in Australian politics
Dutton
Opposition of Australia